Moorefield is a census-designated place (CDP) in Loudoun County, Virginia, United States. As of the 2010 census, the CDP was named Moorefield Station, and the population was 77. As of 2019, the estimated population was 1,976. Moorefield is a mixed-use development currently in progress, located at the Ashburn station currently under construction at the planned terminus of the Metrorail Silver Line.

Geography
Moorefield is in the Ashburn portion of eastern Loudoun County, on the southwest side of the Dulles Greenway (Virginia State Route 267). It is bordered to the northeast by Ashburn proper, to the northwest and west by Brambleton, and to the south by Loudoun Valley Estates.

The area drains southeast toward Broad Run, a north-flowing tributary of the Potomac River.

References

External links
 Moorefield Station Collection at George Mason University Libraries

Census-designated places in Loudoun County, Virginia
Washington metropolitan area
Census-designated places in Virginia